Jochen is a given name. Notable people with the name include:

Jochen Asche, East German luger, competed during the 1960s
Jochen Böhler (born 1969), German historian, specializing in the history of World War II
Jochen Babock (born 1953), East German bobsledder
Jochen Bachfeld (born 1952), retired boxer from East Germany
Jochen Balke (1917–1944), German breaststroke swimmer
Jochen Behle (born 1960), former (West) German cross-country skier
Jochen Bleicken (1926–2005), German professor of ancient history
Jochen Borchert (born 1940), German politician and member of the CDU
Jochen Breiholz, German opera manager
Jochen Busse (born 1941), German television actor
Jochen Carow (born 1944), German former footballer
Jochen Cassel (born 1981), German badminton player
Jochen Danneberg (born 1953), East German ski jumper
Jochen Dornbusch, the coach for the men's Hong Kong national team
Jochen Endreß (born 1972), retired German football player
Jochen Förster (born 1942), East German slalom canoeist, competed in the 1960s and 1970s
Jochen Fahrenberg (born 1937), German psychologist in the fields of personality and psychophysiology
Jochen Feldhoff (born 1943), former West German handball player
Jochen Figge (born 1947), German professional football coach
Jochen Fraatz (born 1963), former German handball player
Jochen Alexander Freydank, German film director
Jochen Hasenmayer (born 1941), German cave diver
Jochen Hecht (born 1977), German professional ice hockey player
Jochen Heisenberg (born 1939), German physicist and Professor Emeritus of Physics at the University of New Hampshire
Jochen Hick (born 1960), German film director and producer of mainly independent feature and documentary films
Jochen Hippel (born 1971), musician from Kirchheimbolanden in southwest Germany
Jochen Horst, German/English Film, TV and Theater actor
Jochen Kühner (born 1980), German rower
Jochen Kientz (born 1972), retired German footballer who played as a central defender
Jochen Klepper (1903–1942), German writer, poet and journalist
Jochen Kowalski (born 1954), German alto or mezzo countertenor, noted for his very rich timbre
Jochen Lempert (born 1958), German photographer whose work is about the world of nature and animals
Jochen Lettmann (born 1969), German slalom canoeist
Jochen Liedtke (1953–2001), German computer scientist, noted for his work on microkernels
Jochen Müller (born 1963), German former footballer, played as a defender
Jochen Mass (born 1946), former racing car driver from Germany
Jochen Meißner (born 1943), German rower
Jochen Miller, trance musician and DJ from Mill, Netherlands
Jochen Neerpasch (born 1946), former German racing car driver and motorsports manager
Jochen Nerpel (born 1983), racing car driver, winner of the German Formula König championship in 2002
Jochen Piest, correspondent for the German newsmagazine Stern
Jochen Pietzsch (born 1963), East German luger
Jochen Reimer (born 1985), Canadian-born German professional ice hockey goaltender
Jochen Rindt (1942–1970), German racing driver, represented Austria during his career
Jochen Sachse (born 1948), East German former athlete, competed mainly in the hammer throw
Jochen Schöps (born 1983), volleyball player from Germany, plays for the Men's National Team
Jochen Schümann (born 1954), German sailor and Olympic champion
Jochen Schmid (born 1963), former Grand Prix motorcycle road racer from Germany
Jochen Schneider (born 1942), West German sprint canoeist
Jochen Schweizer (born 1957), German stuntman
Jochen Seitz (born 1976), German footballer
Jochen Verschl (born 1956), retired West German long jumper
Hans-Jochen Vogel (1926–2020), politician of the Social Democratic Party of Germany, party leader and minister
Jochen Zeitz (born 1963), CEO of the Sport & Lifestyle Group of PPR and Executive Chairman of PUMA SE

See also
1971 Jochen Rindt Gedächtnisrennen, motor race, run to Formula One rules, held in 1971 at the Hockenheimring, Germany